Feliks Rajmund Podkóliński (30 August 1878 - 1966) was a Polish physician and soldier, active in World War I. He was also chief physician of the Evangelical Hospital in Warsaw.

References 

20th-century Polish physicians
1878 births
1966 deaths
Polish healthcare managers